The seventh edition of the Amstel Gold Race for Women was a road cycling one-day race held on 18 April 2021 in the Netherlands. It was the sixth event of the 2021 UCI Women's World Tour. Due to the COVID-19 pandemic, the race was held on a 17 km circuit including the Geulhemmerberg, the Bemelerberg and the Cauberg, and the area was closed to spectators. The race was won by Marianne Vos in a sprint, after the two escapees were caught in the final 500 meters of the race.

Teams
Nine UCI Women's WorldTeams and fifteen UCI Women's Continental Teams are expected to compete in the race.

UCI Women's WorldTeams

 
 
 
 
 
 
 
 
 

UCI Women's Continental Teams

Results

References

2021 UCI Women's World Tour
2021 in Dutch sport
Amstel Gold Race
April 2021 sports events in the Netherlands